Iberian refers to Iberia. Most commonly Iberian refers to:
Someone or something originating in the Iberian Peninsula, namely from Spain, Portugal, Gibraltar and Andorra.

The term Iberian is also used to refer to anything pertaining to the former Kingdom of Iberia, an exonym for the Georgian kingdom of Kartli.

Iberian Peninsula
Iberians, one of the ancient Pre-Roman peoples of the Iberian Peninsula (not to be confused with the Celtiberians)
Iberian language, the language of the ancient Iberians
Iberian scripts, the writing scripts of the ancient Iberians
Northeastern Iberian script
Southeastern Iberian script
Greco–Iberian alphabet
Basque and Iberian deities
Iberian weapons
Iberian mountain range or Sistema Ibérico
South-Western Iberian Bronze, Bronze Age culture of southern Portugal and nearby areas of Spain
Iberian Union, a personal union between the crowns of Spain and Portugal from 1580 to 1640

Ibero-America
Ibero-America, a term since the second half of the 19th century to refer collectively to the countries in the Americas that are of Spanish and Portuguese origin
Organization of Ibero-American States, an intergovernmental organization, comprising the Portuguese- and Spanish-speaking nations of the Americas and Europe, plus Equatorial Guinea in Africa

Kingdom of Iberia
Iberians, Greco-Roman designation for Georgians
Bacurius the Iberian, Georgian general
Peter the Iberian, Georgian theologian and philosopher
Peranius the Iberian, Georgian general
Phazas the Iberian, Georgian cavalry officer
Pacurius the Iberian, Georgian military commander
Hilarion the Iberian, Georgian monk
John the Iberian, Georgian monk, founder of Iviron monastery on Mount Athos
Gabriel the Iberian, Georgian monk
Prochorus the Iberian, Georgian monk, founder of the Monastery of the Cross in Jerusalem
Anthim the Iberian, Georgian theologian, scholar; Metropolitan of Bucharest
Iberian War, fought from 526 to 532 CE between the Eastern Roman Empire and Sassanid Empire over the eastern Georgian kingdom of Iberia

Other
Daily Iberian, newspaper in New Iberia, Louisiana
Iberian horse, collective name of horse breeds native to the Iberian Peninsula
Iberian lynx, critically endangered lynx native to the Iberian Peninsula
Iberian wolf, subspecies of grey wolf inhabiting northern Portugal and northwestern Spain
Iberian gauge, rail gauge used in Spain and Portugal

See also
Ibero-Caucasian languages (or Iberian-Caucasian languages)
Kartvelian languages
Hispanic and Hispanophone
Lusitanic and Lusophone

Language and nationality disambiguation pages

fr:Ibérique